Oxycheilinus is a genus of fish in the family Labridae found in the Indian and Pacific Ocean.

Species
There are currently 10 recognized species in this genus:
 Oxycheilinus arenatus (Valenciennes, 1840) (Speckled maori wrasse)
 Oxycheilinus bimaculatus (Valenciennes, 1840) (Two-spot maori wrasse)
 Oxycheilinus celebicus (Bleeker, 1853) (Celebes maori wrasse)
 Oxycheilinus digramma (Lacépède, 1801) (Cheek-lined maori wrasse)
 Oxycheilinus lineatus J. E. Randall, Westneat & M. F. Gomon, 2003
 Oxycheilinus mentalis (Rüppell, 1828) (Mental maori wrasse)
 Oxycheilinus nigromarginatus J. E. Randall, Westneat & M. F. Gomon, 2003 (Black-margin maori wrasse)
 Oxycheilinus orientalis (Günther, 1862) (Oriental maori wrasse)
 Oxycheilinus samurai Y. Fukui, Muto & Motomura, 2016 
 Oxycheilinus unifasciatus (Streets, 1877) (Ringtail maori wrasse)

References

 
Labridae
Marine fish genera
Taxa named by Theodore Gill